Conus sulcocastaneus is a species of sea snail, a marine gastropod mollusk in the family Conidae, the cone snails and their allies.

Like all species within the genus Conus, these snails are predatory and venomous. They are capable of "stinging" humans, therefore live ones should be handled carefully or not at all.

Description
The size of the shell varies between 44 mm and 63 mm.

Distribution
This marine species occurs off the Philippines and the Marshall Islands.

References

 Kosuge S. (1981) Note on Conus sulcocastaneus Kosuge nom. nov. Bulletin of the Institute of Malacology, Tokyo 1(6): 99.
 Puillandre N., Duda T.F., Meyer C., Olivera B.M. & Bouchet P. (2015). One, four or 100 genera? A new classification of the cone snails. Journal of Molluscan Studies. 81: 1–23

External links
 The Conus Biodiversity website
 Cone Shells – Knights of the Sea
 

sulcocastaneus
Gastropods described in 1981